Anthony Stewart Woodcock (born 6 December 1955) is an English retired international footballer who played professionally in both England and Germany as a striker for Nottingham Forest, FC Köln and Arsenal. Woodcock won the European Cup (now known as the UEFA Champions League) in 1979 with Nottingham Forest.

Club career

Early career

Born in Eastwood, Nottinghamshire, Woodcock had trained with Alan and Steve Buckley as a child, coached by their father, and had played for Priory Celtic. He started his career at Nottingham Forest, signing a contract in January 1974. After loan spells at Lincoln City and Doncaster Rovers, Woodcock broke into the Forest first team in 1976–77, helping the team to promotion to the First Division. Woodcock would later credit the Lincoln move and the leadership of Graham Taylor as being instrumental to his development. Under Brian Clough, Forest went on to win the First Division title and Football League Cup in 1978 with Woodcock winning the PFA Young Player of the Year award that year as well, and the European Cup in 1979. He also scored in Forest's victory over Southampton in the 1979 Football League Cup Final.

Move to the Bundesliga
Woodcock was signed by West German side FC Köln for a fee of £600,000, in time for the 1979–80 season. He spent three seasons there. He scored 28 goals in 81 matches for the Cologne club.

Arsenal
He returned home after the 1982 World Cup, signing for Terry Neill's Arsenal for £500,000. Woodcock was Arsenal's top scorer for the next three seasons, his best tally being 21 in 1983–84; he hit five in a single game against Aston Villa, a post-war record for the club, he also scored the final goal in the last British Home Championship. He helped Arsenal reach the semi-finals of both domestic cups in his first season, and remained in favour with new manager Don Howe, who was appointed in December 1983 following the dismissal of Terry Neill after a dismal first half of the season. He also contributed to a strong start to the 1984–85 season for the Gunners, which saw them top the league in the autumn of 1984.

However, he suffered a serious injury in March 1985, which disrupted his career. With the arrival of George Graham as Arsenal manager in May 1986, the 30-year-old Woodcock was told he was surplus to requirements.

In all, Woodcock scored 68 goals in 169 matches for the Gunners.

Return to Germany
Woodcock then returned to 1. FC Köln for a fee of "about £200,000". During his second spell there, he made 49 appearances and scored 11 goals. He finished his career playing for Fortuna Köln, making 37 appearances and scoring five goals, before retiring from playing in 1990.

International career

England U21
Woodcock made two appearances for the England U21s, scoring five goals; two of which came against Italy U21.

Senior side
Woodcock was first called up to the full England squad for the match against Hungary. He made his début for England in 1978 against Northern Ireland. He would go on to win 42 caps for his country (scoring 16 goals), and play in the 1982 FIFA World Cup. He also played in the 1986 FIFA World Cup qualifiers but was left out of the final squad.

Honours
Nottingham Forest
Football League First Division: 1977–78
Football League Cup: 1977–78, 1978–79
FA Charity Shield: 1978
European Cup: 1978–79

Individual
Nottingham Forest Player of the Year: 1977
PFA Young Player of the Year: 1977–78
Arsenal Player of the Season: 1982−83
Arsenal Top Scorer: 1982–83, 1983–84, 1984–85

References

1955 births
Living people
1982 FIFA World Cup players
Arsenal F.C. players
Doncaster Rovers F.C. players
Eintracht Frankfurt non-playing staff
England B international footballers
England international footballers
England under-21 international footballers
English footballers
English expatriate footballers
English expatriate sportspeople in West Germany
Bundesliga players
Association football forwards
1. FC Köln players
SC Fortuna Köln players
Lincoln City F.C. players
Nottingham Forest F.C. players
People from Eastwood, Nottinghamshire
Footballers from Nottinghamshire
English Football League players
UEFA Euro 1980 players
Eastwood Town F.C. players
1. FC Lokomotive Leipzig managers
SC Fortuna Köln managers
English football managers
English expatriate football managers
Expatriate football managers in Germany
Expatriate footballers in West Germany
English expatriate sportspeople in Germany